Waitaki is an electorate for the New Zealand House of Representatives that crosses the boundary of North Otago and South Canterbury towns on the East Coast of the South Island. The electorate was first established for the  that determined the 5th New Zealand Parliament. It has been abolished and re-established several times and in its early years was a two-member electorate for two parliamentary terms.

Population centres
Through an amendment in the Electoral Act in 1965, the number of electorates in the South Island was fixed at 25, an increase of one since the 1962 electoral redistribution. It was accepted that through the more rapid population growth in the North Island, the number of its electorates would continue to increase, and to keep proportionality, three new electorates were allowed for in the 1967 electoral redistribution for the next election. In the North Island, five electorates were newly created and one electorate was reconstituted while three electorates were abolished. In the South Island, three electorates were newly created and one electorate was reconstituted while three electorates were abolished (including Waitaki). The overall effect of the required changes was highly disruptive to existing electorates, with all but three electorates having their boundaries altered.

This current Waitaki electorate is the successor to parts of the old Otago electorate, with parts of central Otago moving into Clutha-Southland, and the boundary extended far up the South Canterbury coast, to just outside Timaru. The electorate was last re-established for the 2008 election. The 2006 census showed that there has been a general northwards population movement. Even though the number of South Island electorates is fixed, the decline in the population of electorates from Rakaia south has resulted in the boundaries of electorates from Invercargill north to Rakaia shifting northwards. However, Waitaki ended up over quota in the 2013 census and redistribution resulted in all communities south of and including Herbert being ceded to Dunedin North.

The largest town in the electorate is Oamaru (pop. ). Other towns include Geraldine, Twizel, Wanaka, Waimate and Cromwell

History
The Waitaki electorate has existed four times: in 1871 to 1946; in 1957 to 1969; in 1978 to 1996 and lastly since .

The next election was held in early January 1876. Waitaki had become a two-member electorate, and four candidates put their names forward. Steward and Joseph O'Meagher contested the election as abolitionists (i.e. they were in favour of abolishing the provincial government), while Thomas William Hislop and Samuel Shrimski were provincialists (i.e. they favoured the retention of provincial government). The provincialists won the election by quite some margin.

The resulting  was won by George Jones.

From 1881 onwards, the electorate became a single-member constituency again.

William Steward, who was the first representative of the electorate, had since 1881 represented Waimate. He returned to Waitaki for the 1893 election, was successful and also won the five subsequent elections. He held the electorate until 1911. He was appointed to the Legislative Council in the following year, but died within months of the appointment.

The Waitaki electorate was won by John Anstey that year. At the final count, Kidd had a majority of 10 votes, and Barnes applied for a magisterial recount; this increased the 1938 result to a majority of 14 votes. Kidd represented Waitaki until 1946, when the electorate was abolished and he successfully stood in Waimate instead.

Hayman died in office on 2 January 1962 and was succeeded by Allan Dick, who won the 1962 by-election. Dick held the electorate until 1969, when it was abolished again.

The electorate was re-established for the 1978 general election. Jonathan Elworthy of the National Party was the successful candidate. Elworthy was re-elected in the 1981 general election, but defeated in the 1984 general election by Labour's Jim Sutton. Sutton was re-elected in the 1987 general election, but lost to National's Alec Neill in the 1990 general election. Neill was re-elected in the 1993 general election. At the end of the next term, in 1996, the electorate was abolished again. Neill failed to be selected by the National Party as a candidate for any of the electorates for the 1996 general election.

With the advent of Mixed-member proportional representation (MMP) voting system in 1996 and the resulting reduction in the number of constituencies, the electorate was split in half; the town of Oamaru was pulled into the resized Otago electorate and the balance was transferred into the new Aoraki electorate.

Dean increased her majority in the  against Labour's Barry Monks.

Members of Parliament
Key

Single-member electorate

Multi-member electorate

Single-member electorate

List MPs
Members of Parliament elected from party lists in elections where that person also unsuccessfully contested the Waitaki electorate. Unless otherwise stated, all MPs terms began and ended at general elections.

Election results

2020 election

2017 election

2014 election

2011 election

Electorate (as at 26 November 2011): 49,508

2008 election

1987 election

1984 election

1981 election

1978 election

1966 election

1963 election

1962 by-election

1960 election

1957 election

1931 election

1928 election

1899 election

1896 election

1890 election

Footnotes

Notes

References
 

 
 
 

Politics of Canterbury, New Zealand
New Zealand electorates
Politics of Otago
1870 establishments in New Zealand
1946 disestablishments in New Zealand
1969 disestablishments in New Zealand
1996 disestablishments in New Zealand
1957 establishments in New Zealand
1978 establishments in New Zealand
2008 establishments in New Zealand